The 1997 Nordic Tournament was the first edition and took place in Lahti, Kuopio, Falun and Oslo between 9–16 March 1997.

Results

Overall

References

External links
Official website 

1997 in ski jumping
Nordic Tournament